Suranarai Road or Thailand Route 205 is a road connecting Lopburi Province with northeastern Thailand. The road begins at Ban Mi District, Lopburi Province and ends at Mueang Nakhon Ratchasima District, Nakhon Ratchasima Province. It is a strategic inter-regional road, linking the Lopburi military base in central Thailand to Nakhon Ratchasima. The road was built in 1943, during Prime Minister Field marshal Plaek Phibunsongkhram's tenure, but was not completed until 1951. Part of the road was built on abandoned railway track, with several railway bridges being converted into road bridges.

The districts and provinces along the road are Amphoe Khok Samrong, Amphoe Chai Badan, and Amphoe Lam Sonthi of Lopburi Province, Amphoe Thep Sathit and Amphoe Bamnet Narong of Chaiyaphum Province, and Amphoe Phra Thong Kham and Amphoe Non Thai of Nakhon Ratchasima Province.

National highways in Thailand
Lopburi province
Chaiyaphum province
Nakhon Ratchasima province